Since India gained independence in 1947, the Indian National Congress (INC) has seen a steady number of splits and breakaway factions. Some of the breakaway organisations have thrived as independent parties, some have become defunct, while others have merged with the parent party or other political parties.

List of breakaway parties

References 

https://eci.nic.in/eci_main/mis-Political_Parties/Constitution_of_Political_Parties/ConstitutionOfINC.pdf

External links 
 Official All India Congress Committee website
 Official Indian National Congress website

Indian National Congress breakaway groups
India politics-related lists
Political schisms